Hickory Grove is an unincorporated community located in Oktibbeha County, Mississippi, United States.

References

Unincorporated communities in Oktibbeha County, Mississippi
Unincorporated communities in Mississippi